Prostanthera rugosa is a species of flowering plant in the family Lamiaceae and is endemic to a restricted area of New South Wales. It is an openly-branched shrub with egg-shaped or narrow egg-shaped, thick, fleshy leaves and mauve flowers with a white tinge arranged in leaf axils near the ends of branchlets.

Description
Flowering occurs from September to October.

Taxonomy
Prostanthera rugosa was first formally described in 1834 by George Bentham from an unpublished description by Alan Cunningham, of plants collected "on rugged mountains near the Hunter River". Bentham's description was published in his book Labiatarum Genera et Species.

Distribution and habitat
This mintbush grows in forest in the Moss Vale district of New South Wales.

References

rugosa
Flora of New South Wales
Lamiales of Australia
Plants described in 1834
Taxa named by Allan Cunningham (botanist)